LMMS (formerly Linux MultiMedia Studio) is a digital audio workstation application program. It allows music to be produced by arranging samples, synthesizing sounds, entering notes via mouse (or other pointing device) or by playing on a MIDI keyboard, and combining the features of trackers and sequencers. It is free and open source software, written in Qt and released under GPL-2.0-or-later.

System requirements

LMMS is available for multiple operating systems, including Linux, OpenBSD, macOS, and Windows. It requires a 1 GHz CPU, 512 MB of RAM and a two-channel sound card.

Program features

LMMS accepts soundfonts and GUS patches, and it supports the Linux Audio Developer's Simple Plugin API (LADSPA) and LV2 (only master branch, since 24.05.2020). It can use VST plug-ins on Win32, Win64, or Wine32, though currently the macOS port doesn't support them.

It can import Musical Instrument Digital Interface (MIDI) and Hydrogen files, and can read and write customized presets and themes.

Audio can be exported in the Ogg, FLAC, MP3, and WAV file formats.

Projects can be saved in the compressed MMPZ file format or the uncompressed MMP file format.

Editors
 Song Editor – for arranging instruments, samples, groups of notes, automation, and more
 Beat+Bassline Editor – for quickly sequencing rhythms
 FX Mixer – for sending multiple audio inputs through groups of effects and sending them to other mixer channels, infinite channels are supported
 Piano Roll – edit patterns and melodies
 Automation Editor – move almost any knob or widget over the course of the song

Audio plug-ins
LMMS includes a variety of audio plug-ins that can be drag-and-dropped onto instrument tracks in the Song Editor and Beat+Bassline Editor.

Synthesizer plugins:
 BitInvader – wavetable-lookup synthesis
 FreeBoy – emulator of Game Boy audio processing unit (APU)
 Kicker – bass drum synthesizer
 LB302 – imitation of the Roland TB-303
 Mallets – tuneful percussion synthesizer
 Monstro – 3-oscillator synthesizer with modulation matrix
 Nescaline – NES-like synthesizer
 OpulenZ – 2-operator FM synthesizer
 Organic – organ-like synthesizer
 Sf2 Player – a Fluidsynth-based Soundfont player
 SID – emulator of the Commodore 64 chips
 TripleOscillator - 3-oscillator synthesizer with 5 modulation modes: MIX, SYNC, PM, FM, and AM
 Vibed – vibrating string modeler
 Watsyn – 4-oscillator wavetable synthesizer
 ZynAddSubFXOther plugins
 AudioFileProcessor (AFP) – basic sampler with trimming and looping capabilities
 VeSTige'' - interface for VST plugins

Standards
 Musical Instrument Digital Interface (MIDI)
 SoundFont (SF2)
 Virtual Studio Technology (VST)
 Linux Audio Developer's Simple Plugin API (LADSPA)
 LV2 (only master branch, since 24.05.2020)
 Gravis Ultrasound (GUS) patches (PatMan)
 JACK Audio Connection Kit (JACK)
 ZynAddSubFX

Audio output examples

See also
 List of music software
 List of Linux audio software
 Comparison of free software for audio
 Multitrack recording
 Comparison of multitrack recording software

References

External links

 LMMS website

Audio editing software for Linux
Audio editing software that uses Qt
Linux
Digital audio editors for Linux
Digital audio workstation software
Free audio editors
Free educational software
Free music software
Free software programmed in C++
Linux software
Open source software synthesizers
Software drum machines